Port Royal Cross Roads is an unincorporated community in Caroline County, in the U.S. state of Virginia. The community is located where U.S. Route 301 crosses U.S. Route 17.

References

Unincorporated communities in Virginia
Unincorporated communities in Caroline County, Virginia